Macleod was a federal electoral district in Alberta, Canada, that was represented in the House of Commons of Canada from 1908 to 1968 and from 1988 to 2015. It was a mostly rural riding in southwest Alberta, however it extended as far north as the outer suburbs of Calgary, and in its final years included a few slivers of Calgary itself.  It covered the Municipal District of Foothills No. 31, Municipal District of Willow Creek No. 26, Municipal District of Pincher Creek No. 9, Municipal District of Ranchland No. 66, Vulcan County, the Municipality of Crowsnest Pass, and Kananaskis Improvement District. It also included the towns of Okotoks, Cochrane, and High River.

Demographics
According to the Canada 2011 Census

Ethnic groups: 84.1% White, 12.1% Aboriginal 
Languages: 87.7% English, 3.6% German, 1.4% French, ~1.8% Blackfoot (Blackfoot counted as "Other language" on the Census; this number derived from "other language" speakers on Blackfoot reserves) 
Religions: 67.4% Christian (22.7% Catholic, 12.2% United Church, 6.0% Anglican, 2.9% Lutheran, 1.8% Pentecostal, 1.6% Baptist, 1.4% Presbyterian, 18.8% Other Christian), 1.9% Traditional Aboriginal spirituality, 28.9% No religion 
Median income (2010): $33,338

History
This riding was originally created in 1907 from parts of District of Alberta and Calgary ridings.

It was abolished in 1966 when it was redistributed into Rocky Mountain, Palliser  Crowfoot, Lethbridge and Medicine Hat ridings.

It was re-created in 1987 from Bow River, Lethbridge—Foothills, Medicine Hat and Wild Rose ridings.

Due to the 2012 federal electoral boundaries redistribution the riding was abolished prior to the next election. Most of the riding was transferred to the new riding of Foothills. Small parts were also transferred to Bow River, Medicine Hat—Cardston—Warner and Banff—Airdrie. Small portions that had been annexed into Calgary joined Calgary Midnapore and Calgary Signal Hill.

Members of Parliament

This riding has elected the following members of the House of Commons of Canada:

Current Member of Parliament
The seat was last held by John Barlow, a Conservative and a former newspaper editor, who was elected in a by-election on June 30, 2014 following the resignation of Ted Menzies on November 6, 2013.

Election results

1988–2015

	

Note: Conservative vote is compared to the total of Progressive Conservative and Canadian Alliance vote in 2000.

Note: Canadian Alliance vote is compared to the Reform vote in 1997.

1908–1968

Note: NDP vote is compared to CCF vote in 1958 election.

	

Note: Progressive Conservative vote is compared to "National Government" vote in 1940 election.

Note: "National Government" vote is compared to Conservative vote in 1935 election.'Note: George Gibson Coote's CCF vote is compared to his UFA vote in 1930 election.Note: UFA vote is compared to Progressive vote in 1925 election.Note: Conservative vote is compared to Unionist vote in 1917 election.	Note: Unionist vote is compared to Liberal-Conservative vote in 1911 election.''

See also
 List of Canadian federal electoral districts
 Past Canadian electoral districts

Notes

References

 
 
 Expenditures – 2008
 Expenditures – 2004
 Expenditures – 2000
 Expenditures – 1997

Notes

External links
 Elections Canada
 Website of the Parliament of Canada

Former federal electoral districts of Alberta
High River
Okotoks